Winter squash is an annual fruit representing several squash species within the genus Cucurbita. Late-growing, less symmetrical, odd-shaped, rough or warty varieties, small to medium in size, but with long-keeping qualities and hard rinds, are usually called winter squash.  They differ from summer squash in that they are harvested and eaten in the mature stage when their seeds within have matured fully and their skin has hardened into a tough rind. At this stage, most varieties of this vegetable can be stored for use during the winter. Winter squash is generally cooked before being eaten, and the skin or rind is not usually eaten as it is with summer squash.

Cultivars of winter squash that are round and orange are called pumpkins. In New Zealand and Australian English, the term "pumpkin" generally refers to the broader category called "winter squash".

Although winter squashes are grown in many regions, they are relatively economically unimportant, with few exceptions. They are grown extensively in tropical America, Japan, Northern Italy, and certain areas of the United States. The calabazas of the West Indies and the forms grown by the people of Mexico and Central America are not uniform, pure varieties but extremely variable in size, shape, and color. Since these species are normally cross-pollinated, it is now difficult to keep a variety pure.

Planting and harvesting
Squash is a frost-tender plant meaning that the seeds do not germinate in cold soil. It is harvested whenever the fruit has turned a deep, solid color and the skin is hard. Most winter squash is harvested in September or October in the Northern Hemisphere, before the danger of heavy frosts.

Nutritional value

Raw winter squash (such as acorn or butternut) is 90% water, 9% carbohydrates, 1% protein, and contains negligible fat (table). In a 100 gram reference amount, it supplies 34 calories and is a moderate source (10-19% of the Daily Value, DV) of vitamin C (15% DV) and vitamin B6 (12% DV), with no other micronutrients in significant content (table). It is also a source of the provitamin A carotenoid, beta-carotene.

Subspecies, cultivars and varieties

Cucurbita maxima
Ambercup squash
Arikara squash
Atlantic Giant
Banana squash
Buttercup squash
Georgia candy roaster
Hubbard squash
Jarrahdale pumpkin
Kabocha - "Hokkaido squash"
Lakota squash
Mooregold squash
Red kuri squash - also called "orange Hokkaido squash" or "baby red Hubbard squash"
Turban squash - also called “Giraumon”

Cucurbita argyrosperma
Cushaw squash (also called "winter crookneck squash")

Cucurbita moschata

Butternut squash
Calabaza or West Indian pumpkin
Dickinson pumpkin
Long Island cheese pumpkin
Fairytale pumpkin squash or Musquee de Provence
Kent pumpkin

Cucurbita pepo
Acorn squash
Carnival squash
Delicata squash 
Connecticut Field pumpkin
Heart of gold squash
Spaghetti squash
Sweet dumpling squash
Autumn cup squash
Gold nugget squash
Sugar loaf squash

See also
List of squash and pumpkin dishes
Three Sisters (agriculture)
Winter melon

References

External links
Sorting Cucurbita names

Squashes and pumpkins
Thanksgiving food